Octavia Blue (born April 18, 1976) is an American former women's basketball player with the Los Angeles Sparks and Houston Comets of the Women's National Basketball Association (WNBA). She played during the 1998, 2003 and 2004 seasons. She is currently the head coach for the Kennesaw State Owls women's basketball team.

Coaching career 
Blues first foray into coaching was as an assistant coach at St. John's in 2008. she was responsible, among other things for development of post players, and St. John's Dashena Stevens earned the award as the Big East rookie of the year in 2008–09. She remained there for one season before taking a position as an assistant at Georgia Tech. After three years at Georgia Tech Katie Meier, called and offered her a position as an assistant coach at Miami.

Working primarily with the post players, Blue has coached eight players to 10 total All-ACC recognition in her eight seasons at Miami, including six first-team accolades and two All-ACC Defensive Team honors. Over the last two seasons, the Miami alum worked closely with 2020 graduate Beatrice Mompremier, who earned AP and WBCA All-America recognition in back-to-back seasons. Mompremier was a finalist for the Lisa Leslie Center of the Year Award in both 2019 and 2020 and was tabbed ACC Preseason Player of the Year ahead of the 2019-20 campaign.

During Blue's nine -year stint at Miami, five players have signed WNBA contracts, including Mompremier, who was selected 20th overall in the 2020 WNBA Draft by the Los Angeles Sparks. In total, 14 Hurricanes who have benefited from Blue's tutelage have gone on to play professionally. She received a promotion to associate head coach in the fall of 2020.

In April 2021, she was named the head coach of Kennesaw State.

Playing career 
During her collegiate career, she played for Miami amassing 1,724 points on the court during 1994–98. Afterward, she went on to play professional basketball and was selected 15th by the Los Angeles Sparks in the 1998 WNBA Draft, becoming Miami's 1st WNBA draft pick.

References

1976 births
Living people
American women's basketball coaches
American women's basketball players
Basketball coaches from Florida
Basketball players from Florida
Forwards (basketball)
Georgia Tech Yellow Jackets women's basketball coaches
Houston Comets players
Los Angeles Sparks draft picks
Los Angeles Sparks players
Miami Hurricanes women's basketball players
Kennesaw State Owls women's basketball coaches